Ne'ila, the concluding service, is a special Jewish prayer service that is held only on Yom Kippur. It is the time when final prayers of repentance are recited at the closing of Yom Kippur. Neilah marks the fifth Amidah of Yom Kippur, the only such occasion in the Hebrew calendar in which there are so many services.

Contents
In the Ashkenazic and Hassidic rites, Ne'ila begins with of Ashrei, Uva L'Tzion, both of which are postponed from Mincha when they are normally recited on Shabbat and Festivals).  In most other rites, Ashrei and Uva L'Tzion are recited as normal at Mincha, and Ashrei alone is repeated at the beginning of Ne'ila. This is followed by Amidah with Selichot and an abbreviated Vidui; in the Ashkenazic rite, it concludes with Avinu Malkeinu. In Sephardic practice, it begins with the hymn El Nora Alila. The shofar is blown and the song L'Shana Haba'ah is sung at the end of Ne'ila.

In the Eastern Ashkenazic rite, the ark (Aron Kodesh or Hechal) remains open during the leader's repetition of the Ne'ila Amidah, and it is traditional to stand throughout the service. In the Western Ashkenazic rite, like in all of the prayers of Yom Kippur, the ark is open for the entire repetition of the Amidah except it is closed for Kedushah and Birkat Kohanim; most do not stand when it is open. While throughout the High Holy Days, Jews pray to be "written" in the Book of Life, during Ne'ila in all such prayers the word 'write' (Hebrew katav כתב) is replaced by 'seal' (Hebrew ḥatam חתם).

References 

 
Hebrew words and phrases in Jewish prayers and blessings